An election for President of Israel was held in the Knesset on 23 February 1988. 

Chaim Herzog stood for re-election as President of Israel as an unopposed candidate.

Results

References

President
Single-candidate elections
Presidential elections in Israel
Israel